Vinton may refer to:

Places in the United States
Vinton, California
Fort Vinton, Florida
Vinton, Iowa
Vinton, Kansas
Vinton, Louisiana
Vinton, Missouri
Vinton, Nebraska, a ghost town in Valley County, Nebraska
Vinton Township, Nebraska in Valley County, Nebraska
Vinton, Ohio, a village in Gallia County, Ohio
Vinton County, Ohio
Vinton Township in Vinton County, Ohio
Vinton, Texas
Vinton, Virginia
Vinton, West Virginia

People
Alexander Hamilton Vinton (1852-1911), Episcopal bishop
Annie E. Vinton (1869–1961), American politician
Bobby Vinton (born 1935), American pop-music singer
Vint Cerf (born 1943), American internet researcher
Frederic Porter Vinton (1846−1911), American painter
Sue Vinton (born 1956), American politician
Will Vinton (1947−2018), American director and producer of animated films

Other 
Vinton (album), a 1969 album by Bobby Vinton
USS Vinton (AKA-83), a Tolland-class attack cargo ship of the United States Navy